The Scientist as Rebel is a 2006 book by theoretical physicist Freeman Dyson. A few of the twenty-nine chapters in the book deal with the interactions of religion and science.

The book is a collection of essays, prefaces, and book reviews concerning miscellaneous topics. Its title is taken from the title of an essay which originated as a November 1992 talk at a Cambridge, UK meeting of scientists and philosophers. Dyson dedicated his talk to the memory of Eric James, Baron James of Rusholme, who died in May 1992.

References

2006 non-fiction books
Works by Freeman Dyson
Books about religion and science